The Campbell Townhouses, located in northwest Portland, Oregon, are listed on the National Register of Historic Places.

See also
 National Register of Historic Places listings in Northwest Portland, Oregon

References

1893 establishments in Oregon
Houses completed in 1893
National Register of Historic Places in Portland, Oregon
Queen Anne architecture in Oregon
Northwest Portland, Oregon